The 15th Pan American Games were held in Rio de Janeiro, Brazil, between 13 July 2007 and 29 July 2007. The Netherlands Antilles delegation had 43 athletes, 23 men and 20 women, competing in 7 sports.

Medals

Gold

Men's 100 metres: Churandy Martina

Bronze

Women's Team Competition: Netherlands Antilles women's national field hockey team

See also
 Netherlands Antilles at the 2008 Summer Olympics

External links
Athletes of Netherlands Antilles in 2007 Pan American Games

Nations at the 2007 Pan American Games
P
2007